Aroania is a village and a former municipality in Achaea, West Greece, Greece. Since the 2011 local government reform it is part of the municipality Kalavryta, of which it is a municipal unit. The municipal unit has an area of 173.804 km2. The population is 1,619 (2011 census).  The seat of administration was in the town Psofida.  The municipality is named after the village and the mountain.

Subdivisions
The municipal unit Aroania is subdivided into the following communities (constituent villages in brackets):
Agrampela (Agrampela, Platanitsa)
Agridi
Alestaina
Anastasi (Anastasi, Moni Agion Theodoron)
Aroania
Desino
Kamenianoi (Kamenianoi, Drovolovo)
Lechouri (Lechouri, Kerasea, Selli)
Livartzi (Livartzi, Livadi, Livartzino)
Plaka
Psofida (Psofida, Ano Psofida, Ano Tripotama, Kato Tripotama, Tripotama, Vasiliki)
Seires (Seires, Agioi Theodoroi, Agios Georgios, Krini, Thomaiika)

Notable people 
Ioannis Sofianopoulos (1887–1951), politician

Population

References

External links
Aroania on GTP Travel Pages

 
Populated places in Achaea